Omar bin Musa (born 9 January 1984) is a Malaysian-Australian author, poet, rapper and visual artist from Queanbeyan, New South Wales, Australia. He has released three solo hip hop records (including Since Ali Died) and three books of poetry. His debut novel Here Come the Dogs was published in 2014. Here Come the Dogs was long-listed for the Miles Franklin Award and Musa was named one of the Sydney Morning Herald's Young Novelists of the Year in 2015.

Career

Musa was runner up in the 2007 Australian Poetry Slam, before winning in 2008 at the Sydney Opera House. He went on to win the Indian Ocean Poetry Slam in 2010. Musa has published three books of poetry: The Clocks, Parang and Millefiori. Meaning "machete" in Malay, Parang deals with his Malaysian heritage, migration and loss. 

He has performed and collaborated with numerous musicians and hip hop artists, including Kae Tempest, Marc E. Bassy, Daniel Merriweather, Kate Miller-Heidke, Lior, Horrorshow, Mantra, Akala, Soweto Kinch, Joelistics, The Last Kinection, Hau Latukefu from Koolism and L-FRESH the LION.

Musa's debut novel Here Come The Dogs was published by Penguin Books (Australia) in 2014. The story centres around the lives of three disaffected young men in small town Australia. The Guardian Australia described it as examining "race, identity and the unrealised dreams of disempowered Australian youths". The Los Angeles Times said it was "rousing" and "searing", and that "with compassion and urgency, Here Come the Dogs excavates the pain of those who struggle to remain part of a ruthless equation that has been determined by others." Here Come the Dogs was nominated for numerous awards, such as the Miles Franklin Award and the International Dublin Literary Award, and won the People's Choice Award at the ACT Book of the Year Awards. Musa was named one of the Sydney Morning Herald's Young Novelists of the Year and short-listed for the New South Wales Premier's Literary Awards in 2015.

In 2017, Musa released Since Ali Died, a full-length hip hop album featuring Sarah Corry, Amali Golden and Tasman Keith. In 2018, he created a one-man play, Since Ali Died, based upon the album, that premiered at Griffin Theatre in Sydney, Australia.

Musa's work often deals with the themes of migration, Australian racism, violence, masculinity and loneliness.

Bibliography

Books
 The Clocks (2009)
 Parang (2013)
 Here Come the Dogs (2014)
 Millefiori (2017)
 Killernova (2021: Australia, Penguin) (2022: UK, Broken Sleep Books)

Plays
 Since Ali Died (2018)

Discography

Studio albums

Extended plays

References

External links 

Official Facebook writers page*Publishers Biography
An Interview with Omar Musa at Cordite Poetry Review
LA Times review of Here Come the Dogs
Sydney Morning Herald Review of "DEAD CENTRE"
The Guardian Australia's review of "DEAD CENTRE"

1984 births
Living people
Australian hip hop musicians
Obese Records artists
People from Queanbeyan
Australian male poets
21st-century Australian novelists
21st-century Australian poets
Australian people of Malaysian descent
Australian people of Irish descent